Altach is a municipality in the district of Feldkirch, in the westernmost Austrian state of Vorarlberg.

Neighboring municipalities
Five other municipalities surround Altach: Hohenems in the district of Dornbirn, Götzis and Mäder in the district of Feldkirch, and Oberriet and Diepoldsau in the Swiss canton St. Gallen.

History 
The Habsburgs ruled over the villages in Vorarlberg alternately from Tyrol and Further Austria. In 1801 Altach was separated from neighboring Götzis; from 1805 to 1814 Altach belonged to Bavaria, then reverted to Austria. Altach has been part of the Austrian state of Vorarlberg since the latter's founding in 1861. From 1945 to 1955 the municipality was in the French occupation zone in Austria.

Population

Sport

As of the season 2021-22, the football club SC Rheindorf Altach plays in Bundesliga, the highest division.

References

External links
 Official homepage of Altach: www.altach.at

Cities and towns in Feldkirch District